Richard Alloway II is an American politician and lawyer. He is a former Republican member of the Pennsylvania State Senate. He was elected to fill the seat of retiring senator Terry Punt.

Early life and career
Alloway attended Chambersburg Area Senior High School and graduated in the class of 1986 before attending Shippensburg University and then Widener University Commonwealth Law School He served as a magisterial district judge and on the staff of his predecessor, Terry Punt. Alloway was a member of Downtown Chambersburg, Inc., and was the President of the Greene and Lurgan Township Lions Clubs.

Political career
Alloway was first elected in 2008 to serve as the State Senator for the 33rd District, and was subsequently re-elected in 2012 and 2016. Alloway became the Republican Caucus secretary in 2014, and was chosen again for the position in 2016 and 2018.

In the Senate, Alloway served as the chair of the Game and Fisheries Committee, and was a well-known supporter of gun rights and for advocating for protecting animals from abuse. Alloway introduced "Libre's Law," a bill that expanded protections for animals, namely dogs and horses, and granted civil immunity to those who report animal abuse "in good faith" to shield them from frivolous lawsuits. The bill, which received bipartisan support, was signed into law by Governor Tom Wolf in June 2017.

In January 2019, Alloway abruptly announced that he planned on resigning from the Senate, saying that he would like to return to private practice or consider becoming a lobbyist. Lieutenant Governor John Fetterman scheduled the special election to fulfill the remainder of his term on May 21, coinciding with the 2019 municipal primary election.

Electoral history

Source:

References

External links
State Senator Rich Alloway Official PA Senate website
Alloway for Senate Official campaign website

Living people
Republican Party Pennsylvania state senators
Shippensburg University of Pennsylvania alumni
Widener University alumni
Widener University Commonwealth Law School alumni
21st-century American politicians
Year of birth missing (living people)